Seth Burnham (born May 31, 1977 in Santa Cruz, California) is a male beach volleyball and volleyball player from the United States who participated at the NORCECA Circuit 2009 at Manzanillo playing with Marcin Jagoda. They finished in the 9th position.

Currently, Seth Burnham is an active volleyball coach and maintains a presence on the interactive volleyball website Volleyball 1on1 where he appears in instructional volleyball videos. He is in his third year as the head coach of the boys' volleyball program at Thousand Oaks High School.

Clubs
  PTV Malaga (2000–2001)

Awards

Individuals
 2000 NCAA All-Tournament Team

College Indoor
 1998 and 2000 NCAA National Championship with UCLA

References

External links

 
 AVP Profile
 UCLA Profile
 Seth Homepage
 Seth Burnham Volleyball Videos

1977 births
Living people
American men's volleyball players
American men's beach volleyball players
People from Tarzana, Los Angeles